The men's javelin throw event at the 1997 Summer Universiade was held at the Stadio Cibali in Catania, Italy, on 27 and 28 August.

Medalists

Results

Qualification

Final

References

Athletics at the 1997 Summer Universiade
1997